Emil Peter Jørgensen  (born 14 November 1995) is a Danish footballer who plays as a centre back for B 1913.

Career

Move to Europa F.C.
On 30 January 2019, Jørgensen joined Europa F.C. from Gibraltar Premier Division side until the end of the season.

Return to B1913
In September 2019, it was confirmed that Jørgensen had returned to his former club B 1913.

References

External links
Player Profile at thefinalball.com

1995 births
Living people
Danish men's footballers
Danish expatriate men's footballers
Odense Boldklub players
FC Roskilde players
Boldklubben Frem players
FC Fredericia players
AC Omonia players
BK Marienlyst players
FC Vereya players
Europa F.C. players
Danish Superliga players
Danish 1st Division players
Cypriot First Division players
First Professional Football League (Bulgaria) players
Gibraltar Premier Division players
Danish expatriate sportspeople in Cyprus
Expatriate footballers in Cyprus
Expatriate footballers in Bulgaria
Expatriate footballers in Gibraltar
Association football central defenders
Boldklubben 1913 players